Lemförde is a municipality in the district of Diepholz, in Lower Saxony, Germany. It is situated near lake Dümmer, approx. 15 km south of Diepholz.

Lemförde is also the seat of the Samtgemeinde ("collective municipality") Altes Amt Lemförde.

References

Diepholz (district)